Drosophila mojavensis is a cactophilic species of fruit fly from the southwestern United States and Mexico, and was one of 12 fruitfly genomes sequenced for a large comparative study.

References

External links 
 Drosophila mojavensis at FlyBase
 Drosophila mojavensis at Ensembl Genomes Metazoa
 

mojavensis